Jelena Janković was the defending champion, but chose not to participate this year.

Kateryna Bondarenko won her maiden WTA tour title, defeating Yanina Wickmayer in the final 7–6(9–7), 3–6, 7–6(7–4).

Seeds
The top eight seeds receive a bye into the second round.

Draw

Finals

Top half

Section 1

Section 2

Bottom half

Section 3

Section 4

External links
Draw and Qualifying Draw

DFS Classic Singles
Singles

fr:Classic de Birmingham 2008
nl:WTA-toernooi van Birmingham 2008
pl:DFS Classic 2008